Athy GAA is a Gaelic Athletic Association (GAA) club in Athy, County Kildare, Ireland. The club has won seven county senior football championships.

Gaelic Football
On 9 October 2011 in St Conleths Park Newbridge Michael Foley captained a young Athy side to victory against Carbury with a final score of 2.11 to 2.07. Athy scored 2–5 in the opening 15 minutes and two points in the closing four minutes but managed just four points in between, a period during which Carbury accumulated 2–4. Indeed, when Daryl O'Brien rasped home Carbury's second goal in the 57th minute to cut the deficit to two points, it looked as if they might have timed their run to perfection. The next score was crucial and it went Athy's way as Man of the Match Cian Reynolds held his nerve and calmly pointed a free.

"It was a crucial score because Carbury were going very well at that stage," said Athy manager Mark Brophy.

Reynolds added another point in stoppage time, sending the red-clad hordes in the 6,000 crowd into ecstasy as they began the celebrations after a job well done by a well-balanced squad.

Current Panel
 David Hyland
 Mark Hyland
 Mick Foley
 Kevin Feely
 Paschal Connell
 Darroch Mulhall
 Liam McGovern
 James Eaton
 Niall Kelly

Titles

 Kildare Senior Hurling Championship: (3) 1928, 1936, 1959
 Kildare Intermediate Hurling Championship (5)1937, 1943, 1950, 1958, 1989
 Kildare Junior Hurling Championship (3) 1982, 1998, 2007

Camogie
Athy advertised for a reunion of players in 1909. Clan Bridge and St Patrick's clubs from Athy affiliated separately in 1935. Athy beat Ballitore in the 1940 junior final. Ballyroe St Anne's was formed in 1959. Coached by Jimmy Hickey, they won the 1961 senior league, Brigid Moran scored seven goals as they won the 1961 county final and they went on to win four county titles in a row before disbanding suddenly in 1964. Ballyroe won the Senior League in 1960, 1961, 1963 and 1964.

Honours
. Kildare senior football league division 1: winners 2018 

 Kildare U-21 Football Championship: Winners 2010, 2011
 Kildare Senior Football Championship: Winners (7) 1933, 1934, 1937, 1942, 1987, 2011, 2020
 Kildare Minor Football Championship Winners, (7) 1956 1966, 1973, 2008, 2009, 2010, 2013
 Kildare Senior Hurling Championship winners (1) 1959
 Kildare Minor Hurling Championship Winners (1) 1970
 Mick Carolan was chosen on the Kildare football team of the millennium and was a Cuchulainn All Stars Award winner in 1966.
 Geraldine Dwyer was chosen on the Kildare camogie team of the century.
 Cian Reynolds captained the 2009 Kildare minor team to a Leinster Final where they were beaten in extra-time of the replay by Dublin.

Honours Ballyroe
 Kildare Senior Camogie Championship: (4)1961, 1962, 1963, 1964
 Kildare Senior Camogie League (2) 1960, 1961

Bibliography
 Kildare GAA: A Centenary History, by Eoghan Corry, CLG Chill Dara, 1984,  hb  pb
 Kildare GAA yearbook, 1972, 1974, 1978, 1979, 1980 and 2000– in sequence especially the Millennium yearbook of 2000
 Soaring Sliothars: Centenary of Kildare Camogie 1904–2004 by Joan O'Flynn Kildare County Camogie Board.

References

External links
Athy GFC Website
Kildare GAA site
Kildare GAA club sites
Kildare on Hoganstand.com

Gaelic games clubs in County Kildare
Gaelic football clubs in County Kildare
Hurling clubs in County Kildare
Athy